Orah or Suvi Orah is a village in North Macedonia administrative located in the Staro Nagoričane municipality near town Kumanovo in the micro-region of Sredorek. It used to be part of the former municipality of Klečevce.

Location
Orah is located on the south slopes of the Mountain Kozjak, some 20 km in distance from the town of Kumanovo 1 km from the magistral road Kumanovo - Kyustendil. Today's few remaining inhabitants are engaged in sheep breeding and farming.

History
The village was first mentioned in 1519 in one Turkish Defter, according to this document the village had 39 households (all Christian). In the next census, which is made in 1573 year, its recorded 79 households (all Christian, and one Muslim). At the end of 19th century Оrah is one Christian settlement of 760 inhabitants in Kumanovo Kaza.

At the time of World War I village Orah became the administrative seat of the homonymous municipality, and had a population of 615 residents.

Demographics
According to the 2002 census, the village had a total of 113 inhabitants. Ethnic groups in the village include:

Macedonians 113

Landmarks

The most important object near the village Orah is Karpino Monastery with his main monastery church dedicated to Presentation of Virgin Mary, built from the 16th - 17th century.

Another important object is a small rural church dedicated to two saints; St. George and St. Nikolas (village patron), which was probably built in the 17th century (but this is even today not exactly clear).

Events
The most important event that takes place in Karpino Monastery each year is the Karpino Art Colony.

References

Villages in Staro Nagoričane Municipality